Robert (Bob) William Connolly is a Canadian musician, author, journalist and film/multimedia producer.  He was born in 1954 in Hamilton, Ontario, Canada.

Broadcast television, internet, CDROM/DVD 

Bob Connolly produced and directed "Passport to Adventure" and "Timeless Places" which aired in reruns for 8 years from 1996 to 2002 in Canada on VisionTV, The Life Channel, The Learning Channel and CTV Travel.  In a travelogue format, the series dealt with the unexplained mysteries of the world and provided information to the viewer as to how to visit the places mentioned in the program.  The subject matter included lost technology and civilizations, Pyramids, comparative religions, unexplained architecture and psychic phenomena. His former wife, Bea Broda Connolly was a coproducer and host of the show.

A CDROM version of Timeless Places was produced using material not seen on the series. Apple computer eventually licensed an interactive CDROM version of the Timeless Places TV series, rebranded as "The Search For Ancient Wisdom" and gave the CD away free as a bundling deal to all K12 schools who purchased a computer with a CDROM drive. It was one of the first interactive commercial CDROMs produced.  The Search for Ancient Wisdom was also licensed for playback on Windows computers. When the internet became the dominant delivery method for digital content, the Ancient Wisdom CDROM was eventually discontinued but the "controversial" content from the disk found a new life as pirated pictures such as unusual cone head skulls. They have flooded conspiracy websites all over the world.

When high speed internet access became affordable to the home user, Robert Connolly received the very first grant from Bell Canada's Bell Fund to develop and produce free broadband video programming for the internet. One hour TV specials called Virtual Europe and Virtual Canada were produced for The Canadian Learning Channel, which when aired, directed viewers to experience the travel destinations online in video and as a downloadable eBook. Bob and Bea Broda (Bob's former wife) still maintain a YouTube Channel featuring their travel destinations.

Books, eBooks and magazine articles 

Bob Connolly is the author of a print book titled Dynamic Media – Music, Video, Animation and the Web. According to Pearson Publishing's press release, this book was the first of its kind by offering an interactive rich media PDF on CDROM which is bundled with the book.  The book/CDROM eBook teaches you how to make interactive eBooks in PDF.

Connolly is also an expert in the positive therapeutical aspects of electromagnetic fields and lectures on the subject. In 2012, Robert W Connolly released Frequency Therapy – A Quick Start Guide to MAS. The interactive eBook details how to use electromagnetic fields to treat a wide variety of illness. He currently assists health related companies to produce their interactive eBooks for the iPad.

Public speaking

When Dynamic Media was first released, Connolly wrote many articles for magazines that detailed how to make interactive PDF and extensively toured the United States as a convergence-technology expert to give presentations of his interactive eBooks at well attended Adobe Acrobat publishing conventions and How Design Conferences.

Connolly often introduces new technology to audiences and this includes the healthcare industry. He believes the future of medicine lies in "frequency therapy" that is generated via computers. As a companion to pharmaceuticals, electroceuticals and photonics (laser therapy) can be used to treat a wide variety of illnesses that are considered to be incurable. He often lectures on this subject at alternative health conventions.

Feature films

Robert W Connolly is currently producing a series of feature documentary films that showcase the medical inventions of Nikola Tesla. These films are used as speaker support materials in his mixed media live lectures that are presented in movie theatres in UHD 4K video with 5.1 surround sound. The medical devices that are profiled in the feature films are demonstrated live on stage and the audience can download a copy of the film following the event. The lecture series is called Tesla's Medicine and the first completed film in the trilogy is titled "The Universal Fluid".  

It details Nikola Tesla's historical works in bio-electromagnetism that is produced from his Tesla coil and high frequency apparatus generator. The film also features a tour of Eastern and Western Europe to explore the museums, public hospitals, private clinics and factories that use electromagnetism for medicine.

Music production

Robert Connolly released one record in 1978 titled Plateau in which he plays keyboards (Minimoog, Hammond B3, Mellotron) bass and guitar. The record was produced and engineered by Connolly and was recorded in his private recording studio in Hamilton Ontario Canada.

External links

References

Living people
People from Hamilton, Ontario
Film producers from Ontario
Year of birth missing (living people)